Girls under Pressure is the second book in the Girls series, written by Dame Jacqueline Wilson, a noted English author who writes fiction for children. It was published in 1998, the sequel to Girls in Love and followed by Girls out Late. It is aimed at pre-teen and teenage readers.

Like the rest of the series, Girls under Pressure is told from the viewpoint of Eleanor "Ellie" Allard, a plump thirteen-year-old girl who lives with her father, her stepmother, Anna, and her little half-brother, Eggs.

Plot 

Ellie and her two best friends, Magda and Nadine, are Christmas shopping at the Flowerfields Shopping Centre. While they shop, they notice a large buzz of an event going on upstairs. Nadine wonders if it is for television. Magda replies, "Wow, I hope so" and steers the other two upstairs, where they join a queue to discover what all the fuss is about.

It turns out to be a modelling competition for Spicy magazine, which Ellie discovers after seeing a lot of pretty teenage girls getting their photos taken. Ellie stares in horror as she realises what she has been in the queue for. She witnesses Magda and Nadine being photographed, seeing how pretty Nadine is. It is Ellie's turn to be photographed, but she runs away, pushing through the queue as she goes, resulting in one of the girls in the queue exclaiming "She's far too fat [for modelling]". Ellie, hurt and upset, leaves and goes home. She begins to display signs of disordered eating from this point, both by restricting her food intake and making herself sick when she feels she has overeaten.

It worsens when Nadine gets through to the second round of the Spicy modelling competition. Ellie tries to be supportive but envies all of the models and their bodies and reflects how unfair it is that Nadine is so slim despite taking no care over her diet. However, Nadine is not chosen to go through to the next round. The two quarrel, but make it up on the way home. Meanwhile, Magda has been on a date with an older boy called Mick who assumed she was "easy" because of her bleached blonde hair and put her under pressure to have sex outside after their date. All three girls are disheartened as a result.

Ellie is still in the throes of disordered eating and has started to worry her parents due to her weight loss and their discovery of her eating behaviours. She had previously done an art project with Zoe, an intelligent student who has been put up a year to take her GCSEs early, and had more recently encountered Zoe at the swimming pool. Ellie notices that Zoe used to have a "biggish bum" and now she has "amazing cheekbones", due to her lack of food and plentiful exercise. She uses Zoe as inspiration for a time, but one day Zoe is not at the swimming pool or at school. She learns that Zoe has been taken to an eating disorders ward at the local hospital and visits her there. The visit prompts Ellie to examine her behaviours after realising that Zoe got so thin she collapsed and nearly died of heart failure, and she is shocked by how sad and small Zoe looks. Ellie decides that, ultimately, she is not willing to risk everything in the pursuit of being thin and is going to concentrate on being happy instead.

1998 British novels
British young adult novels
Novels by Jacqueline Wilson
1998 children's books
Novels about eating disorders
Doubleday (publisher) books